Rai Khing is a tambon (subdistrict) of Sam Phran district, Nakhon Pathom province, western outskirts Bangkok.

History
Rai Khing is not known exactly how long this area has been in existence. It only know that there are Chinese who settled in the area because it was suitable for planting ginger. Ginger was widely cultivated in large numbers, hence the name "Rai Khing" (ginger farm) since then.

Famous local Buddhist temple, Wat Rai Khing, according to the history, it was built in 1851 during the reign of King Mongkut (Rama IV) and was named Wat Rai Khing, so it is assumed that Rai Khing subdistrict existed before the temple.

In the pre-1960s, Tha Chin water bus from Suphan Buri–Tha Tian in Bangkok also passed in front of the temple.

Geography
Rai Khing is considered to be the central part of the district with Tha Chin River (locally known as Nakhon Chai Si River) flows through the area.

It has a total area of approximately 25.4 km2 or approximately 15,875 rai. Most of the general characteristics are vast plains with fertile land, and have good irrigation conditions with Tha Chin River as the main water resource emptying through and can be branched into 20 tributaries. The general condition of all waterways can still be used for consumption such as farming.

The area is hemmed by other subdistricts (from north clockwise): Bang Krathuek and Bang Toei in its district, Krathum Lom in its district and Om Noi in Krathum Baen District of neighbouring Samut Sakhon Province, Om Yai and Tha Kham in its district, and Tha Talat with Song Khanong in its district, respectively.

Administration
The entire area of Rai Khing is governed by Rai Khing Municipality (เทศบาลเมืองไร่ขิง). It was promoted from the subdistrict municipality in 2008 and upgraded to a major town municipality in 2015.

Rai Khing also consists of 14 administrative muban (village).

The emblem of the town municipality shows Luang Phor Wat Rai Khing, the highly revered principal Buddha statue of Wat Rai Khing. 

Its slogan is "Rai Khing's Smile and Happiness".

Places
Wat Rai Khing
Wat Tha Phut

Local traditions
 Worshiping Luang Phor Wat Rai Khing during the Chinese New Year Festival every year.
 Gilding Luang Phor Wat Rai Khing is held annually at Wat Rai Khing during April shortly before the Songkran Festival.
 Tak Bat Devo and listening to sermons, including gilding Luang Phor Wat Rai Khing during the Buddhist Lent Festival around October.
 Loi Krathong Festival at Wat Tha Phut.

Transportation
Rai Khing is accessible by the main road, Phet Kasem (Highway 4), that runs through the south to the northwest near the area. The subdistrict is crossed by Phutthamonthon Sai 6 Road (Highway 3316) that runs along Tha Chin River meander in the northwest of the area.

Air-conditioned bus route 84 runs from Krung Thon Buri BTS Station in Bangkok to the destination at Wat Rai Khing. While air-conditioned bus route 556 runs from nearby Don Wai Market and terminates at Bobae in Bangkok, passed in front of Wat Rai Khing as well.

References

External links
 

Tambon of Nakhon Pathom Province